Qigu may refer to the following:
Cigu, Tainan, district in Taiwan.
Qigu Formation, geologic formation in Xinjiang, China